The Seagate Stakes was an American Thoroughbred horse race held annually from 1899 through 1907 at New York's Brighton Beach Race Course then for a final time in 1910 with a drastically reduced purse at Empire City Race Track in Yonkers, New York. A race for three-year-old horses of either sex, it was run on dirt over a distance of a mile and one-quarter for the first two runnings then at a mile and one-eighth for the remainder.

Historical notes
The Seagate was a popular race won by quality horses of the era. Among the winners, Charles Edward won the 1907 edition in track record time which also set a new American record. The Seagate was one of three track records Charles Edward would set that year. In a 1910 history of the race, the Daily Racing Form wrote that Charles Edward "gave in the Seagate one of the most amazing displays of high-class speed ever witnessed." 

For the colt Old England, winning the 1902 Seagate was one of several stakes wins that year which included the Preakness Stakes, one of the American Classics that would become part of the U.S. Triple Crown series.

Sir Huon came ino the Seagate Stakes having already won that year's 1906 Kentucky Derby, a race which would also become part of the U.S. Triple Crown series.

End of a Race and of a Racetrack
The Brighton Beach Race Course prospered until 1908 when the New York Legislature passed the Hart–Agnew Law banning gambling in New York State.  Motor racing events were held at the facility in an attempt to keep the track from closing permanently but even after horse racing returned to New York it was too late to save the business.

At the time it ceased horse racing operations, the Brighton Beach Race Course was the oldest horse track in steady use in the New York City area.

Records
Speed record:
 1:50.60 @ 1 1-8 miles: Charles Edward (1907)

Most wins by a jockey:
 No jockey won this race more than once

Most wins by a trainer:
 2 - Thomas Welsh (1904, 1905)

Most wins by an owner:
 No owner won this race more than once

Winners

References

Discontinued horse races in New York (state)
Open mile category horse races
Open middle distance horse races
Brighton Beach Race Course
Recurring sporting events established in 1899
Recurring sporting events disestablished in 1911
Horse races in New York City